Filip Panák (born 2 November 1995) is a professional Czech football centre back currently playing for AC Sparta Prague in the Czech First League.

Club career 
He made his senior league debut for Karviná on 2 August 2014 in their 1–1 Czech National Football League home draw against Most. He scored his first league goal on 16 April 2016 in Karviná's 2–0 home win against Sokolov. After gaining promotion to the Czech First League with Karviná, Panák scored his first goal in the top flight after just 127 seconds of play.

International career 
Panák made his debut for the Czech Under-21 national team on 5 June 2017 in a 5–0 friendly victory against Azerbaijan, scoring a goal.

In November 2021 he was called up to the senior Czech Republic squad and was on the bench against Estonia.

References

External links 
 
 Filip Panák official international statistics
 
 Filip Panák profile on the MFK Karviná official website

Czech footballers
Czech Republic under-21 international footballers
1995 births
Living people
Czech First League players
MFK Karviná players
Association football midfielders
AC Sparta Prague players
Czech National Football League players